Wireless is a 2020 American survival thriller series. It stars Tye Sheridan, Lukas Gage, Francesca Reale, Mace Coronel, Sydney Park and Andie MacDowell. Steven Soderbergh serves as an executive producer. It premiered on September 13, 2020, on Quibi.

Plot
A self-obsessed college student becomes stranded in the Colorado mountains and has to rely on his quickly dying phone to survive.

Cast
Tye Sheridan as Andrew "Andy" Braddock, an alcoholic college student stranded in the Colorado mountains 
Lukas Gage as Jake, Andy's best friend who frequently FaceTimes
Francesca Reale as Dana, Andy's ex
Mace Coronel as Lionel Braddock, Andy's younger brother who has started vaping
Sydney Park as Shannon / "Callie", a girl Andy matches with on Tinder
Andie MacDowell as Elaine Braddock, Andy's overprotective mother who frequently calls
Eric Dane as Officer T.K. Kirschner, a policeman who pulls Andy over
Froy Gutierrez as Brad Carnegie, a college guy throwing the party and Dana's new boyfriend

Episodes

Production

Development
In November 2019, it was announced Tye Sheridan had joined the cast of the series, with Steven Soderbergh executive producing, and Quibi distributing.

Casting
In December 2019, Andie MacDowell, Lukas Gage, Francesca Reale and Mace Coronel joined the cast of the series.

References

External links

2020 American television series debuts
2020 American television series endings
2020s American crime drama television series
American thriller television series
Quibi original programming
Thriller web series
Crime drama web series
Television shows set in Colorado